The ET122 is a diesel multiple unit (DMU) train type operated by the third-sector railway operator Echigo Tokimeki Railway (ETR) on the Nihonkai Hisui Line between  and  in Niigata Prefecture since operations on the line were transferred from West Japan Railway Company (JR West) on 14 March 2015. Built by Niigata Transys and based on the JR West KiHa 122 series DMU design, the fleet consists of a total of eight single-car units.

Variants
 Standard cars ET122-1 to ET122-6
 Special event cars ET122-7 and ET122-8
 Resort train Setsugekka ET122-1001 + ET122-1002

The fleet consists of six standard cars, numbered ET122-1 to ET122-6, and two special-event cars, numbered ET122-7 to ET122-8. The former have reversible transverse seating arranged 2+1 abreast with longitudinal bench seating at one end (total seating capacity 33), and the latter have fixed 4-person seating bays with tables (total seating capacity 40). Both types have a wheelchair space at one end and a universal access toilet.

A two-car resort train classified ET122-1000 (cars ET122-1001 + ET122-1002) and branded  was built by Niigata Transys and delivered in March 2016. This trainset entered service on 23 April 2016, operating mainly at weekends.

Operations

Exterior
The two special-event cars, ET122-7 and ET122-8, are finished in liveries designed by students at the Nagaoka Institute of Design. One is branded "Nihonkai Stream" and the other is branded "3 Cities Flowers".

History
Test running began on the Hokuriku Main Line in December 2014.
In May 2017, the ET122-1000 was awarded the 2017 Laurel Prize, presented annually by the Japan Railfan Club.

Fleet details
The individual build histories are as follows.

References

External links

 ET122 details published by ETR 

Diesel multiple units of Japan
Niigata Transys rolling stock
Train-related introductions in 2015